Is It Real? is an American television series that originally aired from April 25, 2005 to August 14, 2007 on the National Geographic Channel. The program examines popular or persistent mysteries to determine whether the featured cryptozoological creature (cryptid) or supernatural phenomenon is real or not. The show typically includes interviews with believers or proponents of the featured paranormal claims, and then with scientists and skeptics who attempt to find rational explanations for such phenomena using a scientific approach.

Reception

On June 23, 2008, members of the Independent Investigations Group (IIG) discussed Is It Real? and stated that it viewed the show as one of the few programs that encourage science and critical thinking.

Episodes

Season 1 (2005)

Season 2 (2005–2007)

See also
 Cryptid
 Cryptozoology

References

External links
  (archived)
 

National Geographic (American TV channel) original programming
Cryptozoological television series
2000s American reality television series
2005 American television series debuts
2007 American television series endings
Paranormal television